Art Omi, formerly Omi International Arts Center, is a non-profit international arts organization located in Columbia County in Ghent, New York. The organization provides residencies for writers, artists, architects, musicians, dancers and choreographers.

Ledig House serves as Art Omi's home and central meeting place.

History
The Omi International Arts Center was founded in 1992 by Francis J. Greenburger, a New York real estate developer and literary agent, who serves as chairman of Art Omi, Inc., the residency's parent foundation; Sandi Slone, an artist; artist John Cross, an artist; and others. The organization takes its name from Omi, a hamlet in the Hudson River Valley two and a half hours from New York City.

Premises

Art Omi is located in Columbia County in Ghent, New York. It is home to the Sculpture & Architecture Park, (previously the Fields Sculpture Park), which is open to the public throughout the year, features over 70 permanent and temporary exhibitions. The Sculpture & Architecture Park occupies approximately 120 acres of Art Omi's campus.

The main compound is made up of three separate buildings with 18 guest rooms, three conference rooms, a library and communal spaces. Ledig House (named for the late German publisher H.M. Ledig-Rowohlt), a converted 1830 farmhouse, serves as Art Omi's home and central meeting place. The principal work space consists of a two-story converted barn and several satellite sheds. The Charles B. Benenson Visitors Center & Gallery opened to the public in 2008. Omi's facilities are available for rental for corporate retreats from December through March, when residency programs are not in session.

Residencies and other activities
Art Omi offers five residency programs: Art Omi: Architecture; Art Omi: Artists; Art Omi: Dance; Art Omi: Music; and Art Omi: Writers.

Art Omi invites gallerists, critics, agents, publishers, curators and collectors to give talks and presentations. Their visits also benefit residents by providing them with exposure and access to the New York cultural scene. Omi regularly holds exhibitions, readings, concerts and dance performances to which the public is invited.

Funding
Art Omi raises money primarily from philanthropic and corporate foundations and individual donors. Its major fundraising event is a New York City benefit held each spring.

References

Further reading

External links 
 

1992 establishments in New York (state)
American art
American artist groups and collectives
Art in New York (state)
Artist residencies
Arts centers in New York (state)
Arts organizations based in New York (state)
Arts organizations established in 1992
Buildings and structures in Columbia County, New York
Non-profit organizations based in New York (state)
Sculpture gardens, trails and parks in New York (state)
Tourist attractions in Columbia County, New York